Scopula siccata is a moth of the family Geometridae first described by James Halliday McDunnough in 1939. It is found in North America from northern Colorado north through Wyoming, western Montana and Idaho to southern British Columbia and south-western Alberta. The habitat consists of dry slopes in mountainous areas.

The wingspan is 23–24 mm. Adults are grey brown with a contrasting narrow dark median band and a narrower post-median line across both wings.

References

Moths described in 1939
siccata
Moths of North America